This is a list of British literary awards.

Literature in general
Barbellion Prize, for ill and disabled writers
Bristol Festival of Ideas Book Prize, for a book which "presents new, important and challenging ideas"
British Book Awards, the "Nibbies"
Costa Book Awards (formerly the Whitbread book awards)
Guardian First Book Award
International Rubery Book Award
Jhalak Prize
John Llewellyn Rhys Prize
Ondaatje Prize
 The Orwell Prize
Saltire Society Literary Awards
Somerset Maugham Award
The Warwick Prize for Writing
Wellcome Book Prize

Fiction

Fiction in general
Bath Novel Award
Commonwealth Writers Prize
Dundee International Book Prize
Geoffrey Faber Memorial Prize
Goldsmiths Prize
Hawthornden Prize
James Tait Black Memorial Prize, for fiction
Booker Prize (formerly the Man Booker Prize)
Rathbones Folio Prize
Republic of Consciousness Prize for small presses
Wales Book of the Year
WH Smith Literary Award
Winifred Holtby Memorial Prize
Women's Prize for Fiction (formerly the Orange Prize for Fiction and the Baileys Women's Prize for Fiction)

Humour
Bollinger Everyman Wodehouse Prize
Comedy Women In Print, the UK and Ireland's first comedy literary prize for women writers

Crime
CWA Ian Fleming Steel Dagger, for a thriller
CWA New Blood Dagger, for a debut crime novel
Dagger in the Library, for a crime writer, chosen by librarians
Duncan Lawrie International Dagger, for a translated crime novel
Gold Dagger, for a crime novel
McIlvanney Prize, for a Scottish crime novel
Theakston's Old Peculier Crime Novel of the Year Award

First novel
Author's Club First Novel Award
Betty Trask Award
Desmond Elliott Prize
Ruth Hadden Memorial Award
Waverton Good Read Award

Historical
Walter Scott Prize

For young people
Bath Children's Novel Award
Branford Boase Award
Stockport Children's Book Awards

Poetry
Alice Hunt Bartlett Prize
Cholmondeley Award
Christopher Tower Poetry Prizes
Eric Gregory Award
Forward Prizes for Poetry
Gaisford Prize
Geoffrey Faber Memorial Prize
Hippocrates Prize for Poetry and Medicine
Michael Marks Poetry Awards
National Poetry Competition
Newdigate prize
Poetry Book Awards
Poetry London Prize
Queen's Gold Medal for Poetry
T. S. Eliot Prize
Ted Hughes Award
Welsh Poetry Competition

Speculative fiction
Arthur C. Clarke Award
British Fantasy Award
BSFA Awards
David Gemmell Legend Awards
Kitschies

Non-fiction
Alan Ball Local History Awards
Baillie Gifford Prize for Non-Fiction
Bread and Roses Award, for radical, left-wing writing
CWA Gold Dagger for Non-Fiction, for a work of crime non-fiction
Duff Cooper Prize
Hessell-Tiltman Prize, for a work of historical content and high literary merit 
James Tait Black Memorial Prize, for biography
Orwell Prize for political writing
Royal Society Insight investment Science Book Prize for popular science
Samuel Johnson Prize
Slightly Foxed Best First Biography Prize, for biography or memoir
Wainwright Prize for outdoors, nature, UK-based travel writing
Whitfield Prize, for history
William Hill Sports Book of the Year
Wolfson History Prize, for history

Other
 The Barker Book Awards - Celebrating Dogs in Literature
Brunel University African Poetry Prize
 Caine Prize for African Fiction
 Commonwealth Short Story Prize, for unpublished short fiction (2,000–5,000 words)
 SI Leeds Literary Prize, for unpublished fiction (more than 30,000 words) by Black and Asian women in the UK
 Queen Mary Wasafiri New Writing Prize, judged in three categories: fiction, poetry, and life writing; open to anyone who has not published a complete book

See also
List of literary awards
British literature
English literature
Scottish literature
Welsh-language literature
Welsh literature in English
List of years in literature
List of years in poetry

References

Lists of literary awards
Awards